Al-Haditha was a Palestinian village in the Ramle Subdistrict. It was located 8 km northeast of Ramla, on the bank of Wadi al-Natuf. The site, now known as Tel Hadid, has yielded significant archaeological remains from many periods. Al-Haditha was depopulated during the 1948 Arab-Israeli War on July 12, 1948, under the first stage of Operation Dani.

History
It has been suggested  that Al-Haditha was the site of the biblical village of Hadid,  mentioned in the  Book of Ezra (II, 33) and later in the Mishna as a city of Judea fortified by Joshua. Hadid was called 'Adida in the Book of Maccabees, while Eusebius referred to it as Adatha or Aditha.

Ottoman era
In 1870, Victor Guérin visited and  "at a quarter of an hour's distance south-east of Haditheh,  [he] found several ancient
tombs cut in the rock. The village of Haditheh he found to be on the site of an ancient town. Cisterns, a birket, tombs, and rock-cut caves, with cut stones scattered about, are all that remain."

An official  Ottoman  village list of about 1870 showed that "El Hadite" had 28 houses and a population of 145, though the population count included only men.

In 1882  the PEF's Survey of Western Palestine (SWP) described the village as "a moderate-sized village on a terraced Tell at the mouth of a valley at the foot of the hills, with a well on the east. There are remains of a considerable town round it, tombs and quarries exist ; and the mound on which the village stands is covered with pottery."

British Mandate  era

In a census conducted in 1922 by the British Mandate authorities, Hadata  had a population of 415 Muslims,  increasing in the 1931 census to 520, still all Muslims, in a total of 119 houses.
In the  1945 statistics, the village had a population of 760 Muslims, with a total of 7,110 dunums of land.  A total of 10  dunams of village land were used for citrus and bananas, 4,419 dunums were used for cereals, 246 dunums were irrigated or used for plantations, while  16 dunams were built–up, or urban, land.

1948, aftermath
Early in 1948, the  Mukhtar of   Al-Haditha met to negotiate a non–belligerent agreement with the neighbouring Ben Shemen.  However, Al-Haditha was depopulated during the 1948 Arab-Israeli War on July 12, 1948, under the first stage of Operation Dani.

In September, 1948,  Ben-Gurion  asked the ministerial committee for permission to destroy 14 villages, one of which was  Al-Haditha.

In 1992 the village site was described: "The stone and concrete rubble of destroyed houses is visible on the site. Only one house remains; it is sealed and deserted. It has a gabled, tiled roof, and a sign ('BROADWAY 80') is glued to one of its walls. There are also clusters of trees on the site, including Christ's–thorn, olive and eucalyptus trees. The old village road remains and has been enlarged. The surrounding land is cultivated."

References

Bibliography

External links

Welcome To al-Haditha
al-Haditha,  Zochrot
Survey of Western Palestine, Map 14:   IAA,  Wikimedia commons

Arab villages depopulated during the 1948 Arab–Israeli War
District of Ramla
Hebrew Bible places
Canaanite cities
Ancient Jewish settlements of Judaea